Nantan may refer to:
Nantan, Kyoto, Japan
Nantan, Shwegu, Burma
Nantan Prison, China

Also see List of prisons in Qinghai, China